An acid anhydride is a type of chemical compound derived by the removal of water molecules from an acid.

In organic chemistry, organic acid anhydrides contain the functional group R(CO)O(CO)R'. Organic acid anhydrides often form when one equivalent of water is removed from two equivalents of an organic acid in a dehydration reaction.

In inorganic chemistry, an acid anhydride refers to an acidic oxide, an oxide that reacts with water to form an oxyacid (an inorganic acid that contains oxygen or carbonic acid), or with a base to form a salt.

Nomenclature

The nomenclature of organic acid anhydrides is derived from the names of the constituent carboxylic acids which underwent dehydration to form the compound. In symmetrical acid anhydrides, where only one constituent carboxylic acid was used to form the compound (such as the dehydration of propanoic acid, 2CH3CH2COOH → CH3CH2C(O)OC(O)CH2CH3 + H2O), only the prefix of the original carboxylic acid is used and the suffix "anhydride" is added. In asymmetrical acid anhydrides, where two different carboxylic acids were used to give the anhydride (for example, the dehydration between benzoic acid and propanoic acid, C6H5COOH + CH3CH2COOH → C6H5C(O)OC(O)CH2CH3 + H2O), the prefixes from both acids reacted are listed before the suffix, in this case giving benzoic propanoic anhydride, which may alternatively be referred to as benzenecarboxylic propanoic anhydride.

See also
Base anhydride, an oxide that reacts with water to form a hydroxide salt

References